Fraser Clarke Heston (born February 12, 1955) is an American film director, film producer, screenwriter and actor. He is the son of actors Charlton Heston and Lydia Clarke, and has a sister, Holly Ann Heston.

Heston's filmography includes Alaska and the 1990 version of Treasure Island which cast his father as Long John Silver. As a baby, he made his film debut as the infant Moses (his father played the grown Moses) in the Cecil B. DeMille epic The Ten Commandments.

While in the process of writing Wind River, a romantic adventure novel about 19th-century fur trappers, Heston was convinced by producer Martin Shafer to turn the story into a film script. Discovering that film-writing came naturally for him, 22-year-old Heston wrote his first screenplay, The Mountain Men, for Columbia Pictures, which became the feature film.

Credits

Acting credit
The Ten Commandments (1956) - The Infant Moses
The Search for Michael Rockefeller (2010, documentary) - Narrator

Director credits
Mother Lode (1982) (uncredited)
Treasure Island (1990, TV movie)
The Crucifer of Blood (1991, TV movie)
City Slickers (1991, Pamplona, Spain crew, 2nd unit director)
Needful Things (1993)
Alaska (1996)
The Search for Michael Rockefeller (2010, documentary)

Producer credits
Mother Lode (1982)
A Man for All Seasons (1988, TV movie)
Treasure Island (1990, TV movie)
The Crucifer of Blood (1991, TV movie)
Charlton Heston Presents the Bible (1997, video documentary, executive producer)
Ben Hur (2003, video, executive producer)
The Search for Michael Rockefeller (2010, documentary)

Screenplay credits
The Mountain Men (1980)
Mother Lode (1982)
Treasure Island (1990, TV movie)
The Crucifer of Blood (1991, TV movie)
The Search for Michael Rockefeller (2010, documentary)

Personal life
Fraser and his wife Marilyn Heston have been married since 1980. The couple have one son, John Alexander Clarke (Jack) Heston (born 1991).

References

External links

1955 births
American male child actors
American male screenwriters
People from Greater Los Angeles
Living people
Film directors from California
Film producers from California
Screenwriters from California